Cengiz Bektaş (26 November 1934 – 20 March 2020) was a Turkish architect, engineer, poet and writer for Evrensel newspaper.

Education
Bektaş was born in Denizli. He attended Istanbul State Academy of the Fine Arts, and ultimately graduated in 1959 in Architecture while attending the Technical University of Munich. He then went on to teach at various other universities in both Germany and Turkey, notably Middle East Technical University.

Professional career
Bektaş spent his time between the years of '59 to '62 working as a freelance architect in Münich. In 1962, however, he was requested by Middle East Technical University in Ankara to work as a teacher, which he accepted. He went on to work there for a while, after leaving voluntarily to embark on other opportunities.

Since 1963, Bektaş has been working at his own workplace and has also been giving lectures at universities.

Projects
 Etimesgut Mosque, Ankara (1964)
 Babadağlılar Bazaar, Denizli (1973)
 Turkish Language Association, Ankara (1974)
 Kantogan House, Datça (1977)
 Mertim skyscraper, Mersin (1987)
 Library in the Hakiç, İstanbul (1988)
 Dr. Atalay Tunçdemir House, Bartın (1988)
 Bakırköy International Industrial Bank, İstanbul (1988)
 Ayfer Yağcı Bazaar, Balıkesir (1989)
 Library/Esin Aksoy House, İstanbul (1989)
 Büyükada Turkish-Swedish Cultural House, İstanbul (1989)
 Fe-Farma Medical Supplies Factory, Elazığ (1990)
 Akdeniz University Olbia Social Center, Antalya (1999) – awarded by Aga Khan
 Akdeniz University Meltem entrance – dismantled in 2019
 Aphrodisias Oct Museum, Aydın (2007)

Awards received
 T.C. Bonn Embassy, 1st Prize 1963
 T.C. Lisbon Embassy, 3rd Prize 1963
 T.C. Bonn Embassy Building Competition, 1st Prize, 1963
 General Directorate of Turkey Halkbank, Mention 5, 1965
 SSK İzmir Konak Facility Competition, 3rd Prize, 1966
 Cultural Park in Antakya Architectural Design Competition, 1st Mention, 1967
 Bakırköy Elderly Site, 1st Prize, 1968
 TC Vakıflar Bank TAO General Directorate, 3rd Mention, 1972
 Edirne Kapıkule Customs Border Crossing Facilities Architectural Design Competition, 3rd Prize, 1971

Books
 Halk Yapı Sanatı, 2001 (Public Buildings Art)
 Barış Sofrası, 2001 (Peace Supper)
 Selçuklu Kervansarayları, 1999 (The Seljuk Caravanserai)
 Konutlar Villalar / Toplukonut ve Siteler / Yenileme Çalışmaları Yapı'dan Seçmeler 1,1999 (Residential Villas / Toplukonut and Sites / Renovation Work Building Selections from the first)
 Kentli Olmak ya da Olmamak, 1999 (Urban or Not To Be)
 Akdenizli Ozanlar, 1999 (Poets Mediterranean)
 Bak Bak Desinler, 1998 (Let Look, They Say)
 Türk Evi, 1996 (Turkish House)
 Yaşama Kültürü, 1996 (Culture of Living)
 Ev Alma Komşu Al, 1996 (Not Buy Home, You Obtain Adjacent) 
 Hoşgörünün Öteki Adı: Kuzguncuk, 1996 (Another Name of Tolerance:Kuzguncuk) 
 Kent,1996 (Urban)
 Kültür Kirlenmesi, 1996 (Culture Pollution)
 Kuş Evleri, 1994 (Houses of Bird)
 Koruma Onarım, 1993 (Protection Repair)
 Babadağ Evleri, 1987 (Babadağ Houses)
 Şirinköy Evleri, 1987 (Şirinköy Houses)
 Kimin Bu Sokaklar, Alanlar, Kentler?, 1987 (Whose These Streets, Areas, Cities?)
 Kuşadası Evleri, 1987 (Kuşadası Houses)
 Akşehir Evleri, 1987 (Akşehir Houses)
 Yuva mı Mal mı?,1983 (Is Nest or Property)
 Duvarların Dışı da Senin, 1982 (Outside of The Walls in Your)
 Benim Oğlum Bina Okur, 1980 (My Son Study Building)
 Halk Yapı Sanatından Bir Örnek: Bodrum, 1977 (Public Buildings Art An Example from: Bodrum)
 Mimarlıkta Eleştiri, 1967 (Criticism in Architecture)

Appearances
 Kepirtepe Architecture Summer School (Summer School, 2009)
 National Convention of Architects by IIA at Bangalore, India (NATCON 2008)
  as a Key Speaker presented Talk "Traditions extended"
 Architecture and the City Festival-1: "Cities, Coasts ..." (Festival, 2005)
 Young / business / L 3: Workshop on Architecture Students (Workshop, 2004)
 1st Istanbul Architecture Festival (Festival, 2004) 
 Star Gathering 2004 – Project Platform (Meeting, 2004) 
 Cengiz Bektas: Added to Tradition (Interview, 2004) 
 Discuss Architects: Building Making Art (Talk, 2004) 
 Making Buildings Art II (Panel, 2004) 
 Dolphins Aran Conference: Traditions Added (Conference, 2004) 
 Find the Cultural Heritage Evaluation Meeting I (Meeting, 2004) 
 Arkitera Platform 14 (Meetings, 2003) 
 Dialogue Arkitera 2002 – Cengiz Bektas (Talk, 2002) 
 Urban Conservation and Renewal (Panel, 2000) 
 Beşiktaş-Samatia Road Project (Panel, 1991)

References

 Cengiz Bektas, Contemporary Series of Architects of Turkey (Meral Ekincioğlu, 2000)
 Cengiz Bektas and the Community of Kuzguncuk in Istanbul (David Height, 2006)
 By Cengiz Bektas Theoretical Problems in Architecture and Accession Talks on (M.E.T.U. Journal of the Faculty of Architecture Volume 6, Saya.2, Fall 1980)
 Build lovingly, Poetic an Architect; Cengiz Bektaş-Interview (Gamze Akdemir, 2014)
 Cengiz Bektaş (One Architect News, 1986)

Turkish architects
Turkish writers
1934 births
People from Denizli
2020 deaths
Hoxhaists
Anti-revisionists